Leptotrophon perclarus is a species of sea snail, a marine gastropod mollusk in the family Muricidae, the murex snails or rock snails.

Description
The length of the shell attains 17.2 mm.

Distribution
This marine species occurs off New Caledonia at a depth of 400 m.

References

 Houart, R. (2001). Ingensia gen. nov. and eleven new species of Muricidae (Gastropoda) from New Caledonia, Vanuatu, and Wallis and Futuna Islands. in: P. Bouchet & B.A. Marshall (eds) Tropical Deep-Sea Benthos, volume 22. Mémoires du Muséum National d'Histoire Naturelle, ser. A, Zoologie. 185: 243–269.

External links
 MNHN, Paris: holotype

Muricidae
Gastropods described in 2001